Świt Nowy Dwór Mazowiecki  is a Polish football club based in Nowy Dwór Mazowiecki, Masovian Voivodeship.

History 
This team played 2003–2004 in Ekstraklasa under the name "Lukullus Świt Nowy Dwór Mazowiecki"  for first time, but it was relegated after one season as 13th team with 22 points, preceded by 14th Widzew Łódź and succeeded by 12th Górnik Polkowice, which was also relegated with one point more after only season in Ekstraklasa.

Stadium 
Świt plays their home matches at the Municipal Stadium, at the 66 Sportowa Street in Nowy Dwór Mazowiecki. The city is the owner of the stadium and it is managed by the local Sports and Recreation Center. At the turn of 2008 and 2009, an illuminated, full-size training field with artificial turf was put into use.

Current squad

Out on loan

References 

 
Sport in Masovian Voivodeship
Football clubs in Masovian Voivodeship
Association football clubs established in 1935
1935 establishments in Poland
Nowy Dwór Mazowiecki County